3267 Glo, provisional designation , is an eccentric Phocaean asteroid and sizable Mars-crosser from the inner regions of the asteroid belt, approximately  in diameter. It was discovered on 3 January 1981, by American astronomer Edward Bowell at Lowell's Anderson Mesa Station in Flagstaff, Arizona. It was later named after American astronomer Eleanor Helin.

Orbit and classification 

Glo is an eccentric member of the Phocaea family, that orbits the Sun in the inner asteroid belt at a distance of 1.6–3.0 AU once every 3 years and 7 months (1,299 days; semi-major axis of 2.33 AU). Its orbit has an eccentricity of 0.30 and an inclination of 24° with respect to the ecliptic.

The body's observation arc begins with its official discovery observation at Anderson Mesa in January 1981.

Physical characteristics 

The asteroid has been characterized as an L- and S-type asteroid by Pan-STARRS large-scale survey.

Spectral type 

PanSTARRS photometric survey, has characterized Glo as a LS-type asteroid, a transitional spectral type between the common S-type and rather rare L-type asteroids, which have very different albedos, from as low as 0.039 to as high as 0.383.

Rotation period 

A rotational lightcurve of Glo was obtained from photometric observations by Czech astronomer Petr Pravec at Ondřejov Observatory in January 2006. Lightcurve analysis gave a well-defined rotation period of 6.8782 hours with a brightness variation of 0.33 magnitude.

Diameter and albedo 

According to the surveys carried out by the Infrared Astronomical Satellite IRAS, and NASA's Wide-field Infrared Survey Explorer with its subsequent NEOWISE mission, Glo measures 6.45 and 13.56 kilometers in diameter and its surface has an albedo of 0.061 and 0.26, respectively. The Collaborative Asteroid Lightcurve Link agrees with IRAS and derives a similar albedo of 0.0725 and a diameter of 13.59 kilometers with an absolute magnitude of 12.8.

Naming 

This minor planet was named in honor of Eleanor "Glo" Helin (1932–2009), who was a planetary scientist at JPL and a prolific discoverer of minor planets. The official naming citation was published by the Minor Planet Center on 13 February 1987.

Notes

References

External links 
 Pravec, P.; Wolf, M.; Sarounova, L. (2006) http://www.asu.cas.cz/~ppravec/neo.htm
 Asteroid Lightcurve Database (LCDB), query form (info )
 Dictionary of Minor Planet Names, Google books
 Asteroids and comets rotation curves, CdR – Observatoire de Genève, Raoul Behrend
 Discovery Circumstances: Numbered Minor Planets (1)-(5000) – Minor Planet Center
 
 

003267
003267
Discoveries by Edward L. G. Bowell
Named minor planets
19810103